Honey Hill is a census-designated place (CDP) in Adair County, Oklahoma, United States. Within the Cherokee Nation, it was first listed as a CDP prior to the 2020 census.

The CDP is in southeastern Adair County, bordered to the north by Elm Grove and to the south by Bell.

Demographics

References 

Census-designated places in Adair County, Oklahoma
Census-designated places in Oklahoma